Anyasevo (Änäs) is a rural locality (a selo) and the administrative centre of Miyakibashevsky Selsoviet, Miyakinsky District, Bashkortostan, Russia. The population was 921 as of 2010. There are 11 streets.

Geography 
Anyasevo is located 13 km southeast of Kirgiz-Miyaki (the district's administrative centre) by road. Nikolskoye is the nearest rural locality.

References 

Rural localities in Miyakinsky District